Psecacera is a genus of parasitic flies in the family Tachinidae.

Species
Psecacera atriventris Aldrich, 1934
Psecacera chiliensis Bigot, 1880
Psecacera facialis (Townsend, 1933)
Psecacera latiforceps Aldrich, 1934
Psecacera robusta Aldrich, 1934
Psecacera tibialis Aldrich, 1934
Psecacera virens (Aldrich, 1928)

References

Dexiinae
Diptera of South America
Taxa named by Jacques-Marie-Frangile Bigot
Tachinidae genera